Abortion Rights  is an advocacy organisation  that promotes access to abortion in the United Kingdom. It was formed in 2003 by the merger of the Abortion Law Reform Association (ALRA) and the National Abortion Campaign (NAC). The ALRA campaigned effectively after World War II for the elimination of legal obstacles to abortion and the peak of its work was the Abortion Act 1967.

History
The "Abortion Law Reform Association" was founded in the United Kingdom in 1936 by Janet Chance, Alice Jenkins, Joan Malleson and Stella Browne. Its intention was to change attitudes and the law to allow access to abortion in the United Kingdom. Janet Chance created the funding and the marketing whilst Alice Brook Jenkins was the honorary secretary. Jenkins created a network of supporters.

At the end of their first year they had 35 new members, and by 1939 they had almost 400. The membership were gathered from the working class using labour groups and women's branches of the co-operative movement. These women wanted the privileges that “moneyed classes had enjoyed for years.”

The ALRA was very active between 1936 and 1939 sending speakers around the country to talk about Labour and Equal Citizenship and attempted to have letters and articles published in newspapers. They were in the  frame when a member of the ALRA's Medico-Legal Committee received the case of a fourteen-year-old girl who had been raped, and she received a termination of this pregnancy from Dr. Joan Malleson, a progenitor of the ALRA.

Alice Jenkins wrote an important book titled "Law For The Rich" which was published in 1960. Her book drew attention to the double standards that faced women with unwanted pregnancies. Abortion was nominally illegal so many women had to give birth to unplanned children, however rich women could persuade their private doctors that their mental health was at risk. The doctors were then able to carry out an abortion that was denied to most women in Britain.

Lobbying for change
Vera Houghton became the chair of the ALRA in 1963 and over the next seven years she led the organisation. The ALRA's turning point was to gain the support of the Liberal Party MP David Steel, who placed a private members bill through the House of Commons to reform the laws of abortion, choosing this issue over calls to instead amend the law on plumbers or the rights of homosexuals. He cites Alice Jenkin's argument in her book "Law For The Rich" as being pivotal in his decision. Steele put forward a private members bill that was backed by the government and it resulted in the 1967 Abortion Act.

In 1974 the ''Working Women's Charter" was launched at the Trades Union Congress headquarters in London. The charter was an attempt to bridge the gap between women's economic and social requirements. and included equal pay, an end to the glass ceiling, free contraception and access to abortion. In 1975, the Scottish politician James White introduced a bill in parliament to make abortion more difficult. A demonstration was arranged to protest at moves to restrict the then legal access to abortion. This demonstration led to the formation of National Abortion Campaign.

''Abortion Rights" was formed in 2003 by the merger of the "Abortion Law Reform Association (ALRA)" and the "National Abortion Campaign" (NAC). The organization is led by Anne Quesnay.

See also
 National Abortion Rights Action League (NARAL) — American contemporary organisation

References

External links
 
 The archives of the National Abortion Campaign are available for study at the Wellcome Collection.
 The archives of the Abortion Law Reform Association are available for study at the Wellcome Collection.

1936 establishments in the United Kingdom
Abortion-rights organisations in the United Kingdom
Law reform in the United Kingdom
Organizations established in 1936